La Couture is a commune in the Pas-de-Calais department in the Hauts-de-France region of France.

Geography

Population

Places of interest
 The church of St. Pierre, rebuilt along with the rest of the village. after World War I.
 The memorial to Portuguese soldiers of 1914–18.

See also
Communes of the Pas-de-Calais department

References

Couture